The Blohm & Voss BV 238 was a German flying boat, built during World War II. It was the heaviest aircraft ever built when it first flew in 1944, and was the largest aircraft produced by any of the Axis powers during World War II.

History
Development of the BV 238 giant flying boat began in 1941, following the success of the smaller but still enormous BV 222 Wiking.

An approximately quarter-scale model of the BV 238 was commissioned to test the new, long and slim hull design. Built by the Czechoslovakian Flugtechnische Fertigungsgemeinschaft Prag (FGP), the FGP 227 arrived too late to contribute any data to the program.

Although extensive defensive armament was planned the first prototype, the BV 238 V1, had none. Bearing the Stammkennzeichen alphabetic radio code of RO + EZ, it began flight trials in April 1944. It was strafed and partially sunk while moored on Lake Schaal, some miles to the east of Hamburg. One wing remained above water and it was salvaged, but by this time the war had ended and the Allies refused to let it be restored so it was taken out to deeper water and sunk.

Design
The BV 238 was an extremely large flying boat of conventional aerodynamic design, but bearing the usual B&V structural hallmarks of all-metal construction with a tubular steel wing main spar which also acted as the armoured main fuel tank. Of the era, only the earlier Tupolev ANT-20, the Martin XPB2M-1 and the later Hughes H-4 had a bigger wing span. However it would be the heaviest yet flown, at  fully loaded.

The hull had an unusually long and slim planing bottom, of essentially two-step design but with a row of smaller auxiliary steps behind the main one. A large nose door opened onto its cavernous interior, with the main crew cabin immediately above and behind it.

The wing was of straight, constant-chord form with tapered outer sections. Auxiliary floats were integrated into underside panels of the outer sections and could be retracted to lie flush with the wing. A catwalk ran internally along the wing in front of the tubular steel main spar, providing access to the engines in flight.

Power was provided by six 1,287 kW (1,750 hp) Daimler-Benz DB 603 liquid-cooled inverted V12 piston engines, arranged in nacelles along the leading edge of the centre section.

BV 250 
A landplane version, initially called the BV 238-Land, was proposed, capable of carrying out transport, long-range bombing and transatlantic reconnaissance duties.

The lower hull was replaced by a plain fairing with retractable undercarriage comprising twelve main and two nose wheels. One bomb bay filled the space between the wheel bays, another lay behind the main undercarriage. The wing floats were similarly replaced with retractable outrigger stabilising wheels. The nose wheel could be folded up, making the aircraft "kneel" and allowing vehicles to drive directly on- and off-board via a loading ramp to the nose doorway. Alternatively, passenger seating could be fitted. A further, upper deck behind the crew cockpit accommodated further passengers, bringing the total capacity to 300 troops.<ref>Sharp, D.; Luftwaffe:Secret Bombers of the Third Reich, Mortons, 2016, pp.36-39.</ref>

Renamed the BV 250 in 1942, three prototypes were ordered but none were finished by the end of the war.

Specifications (BV 238A-02 (V6))

See also

Notes

Bibliography

 Green, William (1970). Warplanes of the Third Reich. London: Macdonald and Jane's Publishers Ltd., (4th impression 1979). .
 . (Translation of the German original Luftgiganten über See: BV 222 Viking - BV 238''. Friedberg, Germany: Podzun-Pallas Verlag GmbH, 1980. .)

External links

BV 238
1940s German military transport aircraft
Flying boats
Six-engined tractor aircraft
High-wing aircraft
Aircraft first flown in 1944